was a town located in Kagawa District, Kagawa Prefecture, Japan.

As of 2003, the town had an estimated population of 7,938 and a density of 539.27 persons per km². The total area was 14.72 km².

On January 10, 2006, Kōnan, along with the towns of Aji and Mure (both from Kita District), the town of Kagawa (also from Kagawa District), and the town of Kokubunji (from Ayauta District), was merged into the expanded city of Takamatsu and no longer exists as an independent municipality.

External links
 Official website of Takamatsu 
 Official website of Takamatsu 

Dissolved municipalities of Kagawa Prefecture
Takamatsu, Kagawa